Stadio Nicola Ceravolo is a multi-purpose stadium in Catanzaro, Italy. The stadium was built in 1919 and it is one of the oldest in Italy

It holds 14,650, third for capacity in Calabria. It is currently the home of F.C. Catanzaro.

Since 1989 the stadium is named as Nicola Ceravolo, an historical president of the giallorossi since 1958 to 1979.

History

Early years (1919 -1970) 

The stadium"Nicola Ceravolo" is set on a plot of land in the locality of "Corallo", near the slopes of the mountain Spezzano.
Its use dates back to the early decades of the twentieth century, when, coinciding with the beginning of the first world war, it was used as a concentration camp for prisoners of war. The end of the war also marks a different use of the plant, which is known as "Piazza d'Armi", is used for training troops stationed in Catanzaro, then the headquarters of the Division Command and the 19th Infantry Regiment

In the '20 the ever growing interest for sports, particularly for football, determines the adaptation of the structure to the new needs of the citizens, so in October 1924, after about seven months of work, the new sports field, which takes the name of "Divisional Stadium", is presented with a sumptuous inauguration. Owned by the 21st Division of the Military Division.

For the new opportunity, it happened here the"III Congresso Sportivo Calabrese" which ended with the representation of hundreds of athletes divided into various sports disciplines.

For what regards football it was founded a special tournament called "Cup city of Catanzaro and Cosenza", in which three groups took part: Fortitudo Cosenza, the Audace of Catanzaro and the Nuovo Reggio Football Club. It was the Reggina team that won the trophy by beating the Audace in the final by 3–0.

The new "Divisional Stadium", later known as the "Military Stadium", was equipped with a leveled playing field, flanked by a "war path", an elevated runway and graceful wooden benches, well furnished inside . During the twenties the plant will be used mainly by the military for their operational purposes, but also by sports companies with appropriate authorization.

In 1927 the Fascist Catanzaro Sports Union (a partnership born of the merger between Scalfaro and Braccini), chaired by Enrico Talamo, was included in the regional Third Division championship (comparable to the current Serie D), thus marking the entrance of the Catanzaro football in the national sports area.

This event suggests to the military and civil authorities of the time, to regulate the use of the structure through a concession to the Municipality of Catanzaro.

In the following years the plant was renamed "Stadio Comunale" and, under the presidency of Aldo Ferrara (1950–1958), it was equipped with a functional and comfortable staircase (the Distinti), built on the old "lawn", with underlying showers, press room and warehouse.

To the restyling for Serie A to the proposal for the new stadium (1971–2006) 
The first major and radical restructuring took place in the summer of 1971. The US Catanzaro has just won its first historical promotion in Serie A and the Municipality decides to build a covered grandstand, to extend the curves and to add a press room to the summit of the distinguished sector, which make the complex suitable for the contest of the prestigious tournament. The works are completed on 16 October 1971 and at the end of the make-up the stadium will have a capacity, never officially determined, of around 20,000 seats.
Further changes are made under the "Di Marzio" era. The Neapolitan coach convinces the Municipality to build further steps on existing ones, thus managing to bring the total capacity to 30,000 seats. These changes make the "Military" one of the largest stadiums in Southern Italy, despite the fact that the plant is not in compliance with the regulations of the time.

In 1989 the stadium was dedicated to Nicola Ceravolo, in recognition of fifty years of fervent and passionate activity for sport and for Catanzaro.

A monument will be dedicated to the Giallorossi president at the entrance to the "West Bend" sector next to a sea pine that dominates the curve.

In 1996 the "West Bend", a sector populated by the hottest fringe of Catanzaro fans, was named after Massimo Capraro, a young ultras who died prematurely in a tragic car accident.

In 1998 the Municipality of Catanzaro was forced to perform various jobs to adapt the sports facility to the new regulations; among the innovations are replaced the old iron nets of Tribuna and Distinti with modern shatterproof glass.

The substitution of the nets will make the sectors of Tribuna and Distinti much closer to the playing field, making the athletic track disappear and, with it, the multi-functionality of the entire sports facility. These adjustments will lead to the capacity, officially determined by the provincial supervisory commission, of 11 033 seats.

With the return of the Catanzaro in Serie B, in the 2004–2005 season, some marginal jobs were carried out on the pitch and the video surveillance system.

Furthermore, the East bend for visiting fans was named after the historic footballer Angelo Mammì, who under that sector, on 30 January 1972, scored the decisive goal at the end of the second half which allowed Catanzaro to beat Juventus in the match valid for first day of return of the Serie A championship 1971–1972.

Between 2003 and 2004, the then administrators of the U.S. Catanzaro Massimo Poggi and Claudio Parente put forward the concrete proposal for the construction of a new stadium in a different urban area, presumably in the Germaneto quarter.

This would have ensured optimal connections to the new plant as the area is easily accessible. The new stadium – based on the English model – approved to host UEFA international events, should have had a capacity of at least 28,000 seats and host various businesses, sports facilities, offices, restaurants and a hotel.

The proposal to relocate the new stadium was received among the criticisms of the majority of fans, justified by the historical and symbolic value of the "old" Ceravolo stadium.

In 2004, the model of the renewed Ceravolo was presented at a press conference, which included the demolition of curves and distinct so as to reconstruct everything on the model of the Marassi Stadium in Genoa.

The projects were set aside following the failure of the Catanzaro Sports Union in the summer of 2006

From the Pisanu decree to the present day (2006–) 
In the 2007–2008 season, following the approval of the Pisanu decree, the approved capacity of the Ceravolo stadium was reduced to 7499 places with the total closure of the separate sector and the East stand area.

In 2008 the ownership of the plant passed from the State Property to the Municipality of Catanzaro and on 18 September the works for the adaptation of the plant to the new regulations began, for an amount of approximately 2 million euros, giving way to the most important and massive structural intervention since the first promotion in Serie A (1971).

The most significant interventions concern the arrangement of seats and the numbering of seats, the division of sectors and the identification of escape routes, the installation of 15 turnstiles (750 people per hour), adequate toilets for spectators , lighting system, first aid stations, parking area with 200 seats for the "guest" sector, alarm systems, modernization of the press box and construction of an "interview room" close to the locker rooms.

During the works, in the summer of 2008, the historic marine pine that rose from the terraces of the Massimo Capraro curve was demolished, a unique detail among the stadiums throughout Italy.

The renovated Nicola Ceravolo stadium is a fully compliant facility, with an officially determined capacity of 14 650 seats, all numbered, and a remarkable glance determined by the laying of Giallorossi seats.

References

Nicola Ceravolo
Nicola
U.S. Catanzaro 1929
Sports venues in Calabria
Buildings and structures in the Province of Catanzaro
Buildings and structures completed in 1919